Oslo is one of the 19 multi-member constituencies of the Storting, the national legislature of Norway. The constituency was established as Kristiania in 1921 following the introduction of proportional representation for elections to the Storting. It was renamed Oslo from 1925. It is conterminous with the county of Oslo. The constituency currently elects 19 of the 169 members of the Storting using the open party-list proportional representation electoral system. At the 2021 parliamentary election it had 485,656 registered electors.

Electoral system
Oslo currently elects 19 of the 169 members of the Storting using the open party-list proportional representation electoral system. Constituency seats are allocated by the County Electoral Committee using the Modified Sainte-Laguë method. Compensatory seats (seats at large) are calculated based on the national vote and are allocated by the National Electoral Committee using the Modified Sainte-Laguë method at the constituency level (one for each constituency). Only parties that reach the 4% national threshold compete for compensatory seats.

Election results

Summary

(Excludes compensatory seats. Figures in italics represent joint lists.)

Detailed

2020s

2021
Results of the 2021 parliamentary election held on 13 September 2021:

The following candidates were elected:
Grunde Almeland (V); Nikolai Astrup (H); Seher Aydar (R); Lan Marie Berg (MDG); Espen Barth Eide (Ap); Ola Elvestuen (V); Kamzy Gunaratnam (Ap); Rasmus Hansson (MDG); Marian Abdi Hussein (SV); Kari Elisabeth Kaski (SV); Mudassar Kapur (H); Heidi Nordby Lunde (H); Guri Melby (V); Bjørnar Moxnes (R); Ine Eriksen Søreide (H); Jonas Gahr Støre (Ap); Trine Lise Sundnes (Ap); Christian Tybring-Gjedde (FrP); Mathilde Tybring-Gjedde (H); and Andreas Sjalg Unneland (SV).

2010s

2017
Results of the 2017 parliamentary election held on 11 September 2017:

The following candidates were elected:
Nikolai Astrup (H); Une Aina Bastholm (MDG); Jan Bøhler (Ap); Espen Barth Eide (Ap); Petter Eide (SV); Ola Elvestuen (V); Trine Skei Grande (V); Stefan Heggelund (H); Siv Jensen (FrP); Mudassar Kapur (H); Kari Elisabeth Kaski (SV); Heidi Nordby Lunde (H); Marianne Marthinsen (Ap); Bjørnar Moxnes (R); Siri Staalesen (Ap); Ine Eriksen Søreide (H); Jonas Gahr Støre (Ap); Michael Tetzschner (H); and Christian Tybring-Gjedde (FrP).

2013
Results of the 2013 parliamentary election held on 8 and 9 September 2013:

The following candidates were elected:
Nikolai Astrup (H); Jan Bøhler (Ap); Ola Elvestuen (V); Trine Skei Grande (V); Rasmus Hansson (MDG); Stefan Heggelund (H); Heikki Holmås (SV); Siv Jensen (FrP); Mudassar Kapur (H); Marianne Marthinsen (Ap); Marit Nybakk (Ap); Ine Eriksen Søreide (H); Jens Stoltenberg (Ap); Jonas Gahr Støre (Ap); Hans Olav Syversen (KrF); Hadia Tajik (Ap); Michael Tetzschner (H); Christian Tybring-Gjedde (FrP); and Kristin Vinje (H).

2000s

2009
Results of the 2009 parliamentary election held on 13 and 14 September 2009:

The following candidates were elected:
Nikolai Astrup (H); Jan Bøhler (Ap); Per-Kristian Foss (H); Trine Skei Grande (V); Kristin Halvorsen (SV); Heikki Holmås (SV); Siv Jensen (FrP); Marianne Marthinsen (Ap); Peter N. Myhre (FrP); Marit Nybakk (Ap); Ine Eriksen Søreide (H); Jens Stoltenberg (Ap); Jonas Gahr Støre (Ap); Hans Olav Syversen (KrF); Hadia Tajik (Ap); Michael Tetzschner (H); and Christian Tybring-Gjedde (FrP).

2005
Results of the 2005 parliamentary election held on 11 and 12 September 2005:

The following candidates were elected:
Jan Bøhler (Ap); Odd Einar Dørum (V); Per-Kristian Foss (H); Trine Skei Grande (V); Carl I. Hagen (FrP); Kristin Halvorsen (SV); Britt Hildeng (Ap); Heikki Holmås (SV); Siv Jensen (FrP); Saera Khan (Ap); Inge Lønning (H); Marianne Marthinsen (Ap); Marit Nybakk (Ap); Ine Eriksen Søreide (H); Jens Stoltenberg (Ap); Hans Olav Syversen (KrF); and Christian Tybring-Gjedde (FrP).

2001
Results of the 2001 parliamentary election held on 9 and 10 September 2001:

The following candidates were elected:
Kristin Krohn Devold (H); Odd Einar Dørum (V); Per-Kristian Foss (H); Bjørgulv Froyn (Ap); Carl I. Hagen (FrP); Kristin Halvorsen (SV); Britt Hildeng (Ap); Heikki Holmås (SV); Siv Jensen (FrP); Heidi Larssen (H); Inge Lønning (H); Marit Nybakk (Ap); Afshan Rafiq (H); Lars Rise (KrF); Heidi Sørensen (SV); and Jens Stoltenberg (Ap).

1990s

1997
Results of the 1997 parliamentary election held on 15 September 1997:

The following candidates were elected:
Dag Danielsen (FrP); Kristin Krohn Devold (H); Odd Einar Dørum (V); Per-Kristian Foss (H); Bjørn Tore Godal (Ap); Carl I. Hagen (FrP); Kristin Halvorsen (SV); Britt Hildeng (Ap); Annelise Høegh (H); Inger Lise Husøy (Ap); Siv Jensen (FrP); Rune E. Kristiansen (Ap); Inge Lønning (H); Marit Nybakk (Ap); Lars Rise (KrF); Erik Solheim (SV); and Jens Stoltenberg (Ap).

1993
Results of the 1993 parliamentary election held on 12 and 13 September 1993:

The following candidates were elected:
Thorbjørn Berntsen (Ap); Gro Harlem Brundtland (Ap); Ellen Christine Christiansen (FrP); Kristin Krohn Devold (H); Grete Faremo (Ap); Erling Folkvord (RV); Per-Kristian Foss (H); Bjørn Tore Godal (Ap); Carl I. Hagen (FrP); Kristin Halvorsen (SV); Arne Haukvik (Sp); Annelise Høegh (H); Marit Nybakk (Ap); Anders C. Sjaastad (H); Erik Solheim (SV); Jens Stoltenberg (Ap); and Jan P. Syse (H).

1980s

1989
Results of the 1989 parliamentary election held on 10 and 11 September 1989:

The following candidates were elected:
Thorbjørn Berntsen (Ap); Eleonore Bjartveit (KrF); Gro Harlem Brundtland (Ap); Kristin Clemet (H); Per-Kristian Foss (H); Bjørn Tore Godal (Ap); Carl I. Hagen (FrP); Kristin Halvorsen (SV); Annelise Høegh (H); Theo Koritzinsky (SV); Marit Nybakk (Ap); Sissel Rønbeck (Ap); Anders C. Sjaastad (H); Pål Atle Skjervengen (FrP); Jan P. Syse (H); and Tor Mikkel Wara (FrP).

1985
Results of the 1985 parliamentary election held on 8 and 9 September 1985:

As the list alliance was entitled to more seats contesting as an alliance than it was contesting as individual parties, the distribution of seats was as list alliance votes. The KrF-Sp-DLF list alliance's seat was allocated to the Christian Democratic Party.

The following candidates were elected:
Thorbjørn Berntsen (Ap); Gro Harlem Brundtland (Ap); Einar Førde (Ap); Per-Kristian Foss (H); Knut Frydenlund (Ap); Carl I. Hagen (FrP); Astrid Nøklebye Heiberg (H); Annelise Høegh (H); Theo Koritzinsky (SV); Kåre Kristiansen (KrF); Lars Roar Langslet (H); Sissel Rønbeck (Ap); Anders C. Sjaastad (H); Jan P. Syse (H); and Kåre Willoch (H).

1981
Results of the 1981 parliamentary election held on 13 and 14 September 1981:

The following candidates were elected:
Thorbjørn Berntsen (Ap); Gro Harlem Brundtland (Ap); Per Ditlev-Simonsen (H); Per-Kristian Foss (H); Knut Frydenlund (Ap); Carl I. Hagen (FrP); Kåre Kristiansen (KrF); Lars Roar Langslet (H); Wenche Lowzow (H); Stein Ørnhøi (SV); Sissel Rønbeck (Ap); Reiulf Steen (Ap); Jan P. Syse (H); Grethe Værnø (H); and Kåre Willoch (H).

1970s

1977
Results of the 1977 parliamentary election held on 11 and 12 September 1977:

The following candidates were elected:
Thorbjørn Berntsen (Ap); Trygve Bratteli (Ap); Gro Harlem Brundtland (Ap); Einar Førde (Ap); Knut Frydenlund (Ap); Karin Hafstad (H); Haldis Havrøy (Ap); Kåre Kristiansen (KrF); Lars Roar Langslet (H); Wenche Lowzow (H); Stein Ørnhøi (SV); Reiulf Steen (Ap); Jan P. Syse (H); Paul Thyness (H); and Kåre Willoch (H).

1973
Results of the 1973 parliamentary election held on 9 and 10 September 1973:

The following candidates were elected:
Berit Ås (SV); Trygve Bratteli (Ap); Einar Førde (Ap); Knut Frydenlund (Ap); Finn Gustavsen (SV); Karin Hafstad (H); Haldis Havrøy (Ap); Kåre Kristiansen (KrF); Anders Lange (ALP); Lars Roar Langslet (H); Gunnar Alf Larsen (Ap); Aase Lionæs (Ap); Jan P. Syse (H); Paul Thyness (H); and Kåre Willoch (H).

1960s

1969
Results of the 1969 parliamentary election held on 7 and 8 September 1969:

The following candidates were elected:
Egil Aarvik (KrF); Trygve Bratteli (Ap); Einar Førde (Ap); Knut Frydenlund (Ap); Lars Roar Langslet (H); Gunnar Alf Larsen (Ap); Aase Lionæs (Ap); Erling Petersen (H); Tove Pihl (Ap); Berte Rognerud (H); Helge Seip (V); Paul Thyness (H); and Kåre Willoch (H).

1965
Results of the 1965 parliamentary election held on 12 and 13 September 1965:

The following candidates were elected:
Trygve Bratteli (Ap); Reidar Bruu (H); Einar Gerhardsen (Ap); Finn Gustavsen (SF); Gunnar Alf Larsen (Ap); Aase Lionæs (Ap); Finn Moe (Ap); Erling Petersen (H); Berte Rognerud (H); Helge Seip (V); Rakel Seweriin (Ap); Paul Thyness (H); and Kåre Willoch (H).

1961
Results of the 1961 parliamentary election held on 11 September 1961:

The following candidates were elected:
Egil Aarvik (KrF), 15,257 votes; Trygve Bratteli (Ap), 123,135 votes; Reidar Bruu (H), 110,839 votes; Einar Gerhardsen (Ap), 123,126 votes; Finn Gustavsen (SF), 18,117 votes; Aase Lionæs (Ap), 123,129 votes; Per Lønning (H), 110,846 votes; Finn Moe (Ap), 123,134 votes; Konrad Nordahl (Ap), 123,116 votes; Erling Petersen (H), 110,840 votes; Berte Rognerud (H), 110,843 votes; Rakel Seweriin (Ap), 123,129 votes; and Kåre Willoch (H), 110,850 votes.

1950s

1957
Results of the 1957 parliamentary election held on 7 October 1957:

The following candidates were elected:
Trygve Bratteli (Ap); Reidar Bruu (H); Einar Gerhardsen (Ap); Aase Lionæs (Ap); Per Lønning (H); Finn Moe (Ap); Konrad Nordahl (Ap); Erling Petersen (H); Berte Rognerud (H); Helge Seip (V); Rakel Seweriin (Ap); Erling Wikborg (KrF); and Kåre Willoch (H).

1953
Results of the 1953 parliamentary election held on 12 October 1953:

The following candidates were elected:
Reidar Bruu (H); Trygve Bratteli (Ap); Lars Evensen (Ap); Einar Gerhardsen (Ap); C. J. Hambro (H); Finn Moe (Ap); Erling Petersen (H); Berte Rognerud (H); Helge Seip (V); Rakel Seweriin (Ap); Herman Smitt Ingebretsen (H); Johan Strand Johansen (K); and Erling Wikborg (KrF).

1940s

1949
Results of the 1949 parliamentary election held on 10 October 1949:

The following candidates were elected:
Trygve Bratteli (Ap); Einar Gerhardsen (Ap); C. J. Hambro (H); Finn Moe (Ap); Rakel Seweriin (Ap); Herman Smitt Ingebretsen (H); and Rolf Stranger (H).

1945
Results of the 1945 parliamentary election held on 8 October 1945:

The following candidates were elected:
Einar Gerhardsen (Ap); C. J. Hambro (H); Ingvald Haugen (Ap); Rakel Seweriin (Ap); Johan Strand Johansen (K); Rolf Stranger (H); and Oscar Torp (Ap).

1930s

1936
Results of the 1936 parliamentary election held on 19 October 1936:

The following candidates were elected:
Eyvind Getz (H); C. J. Hambro (H); Olaf Josef Johansen (Ap); Alfred Madsen (Ap); Magnus Nilssen (Ap); Arthur Nordlie (H); and Oscar Torp (Ap).

1933
Results of the 1933 parliamentary election held on 16 October 1933:

As the list alliances were not entitled to more seats contesting as alliances than they were contesting as individual parties, the distribution of seats was as party votes.

The following candidates were elected:
Eyvind Getz (H); C. J. Hambro (H); Olaf Josef Johansen (Ap); Helga Karlsen (Ap); Alfred Madsen (Ap); Magnus Nilssen (Ap); and Arthur Nordlie (H).

1930
Results of the 1930 parliamentary election held on 20 October 1930:

As the list alliance was not entitled to more seats contesting as an alliance than it was contesting as individual parties, the distribution of seats was as party votes.

The following candidates were elected:
Johan H. Andresen (H); C. J. Hambro (H); Olaf Josef Johansen (Ap); Alfred Madsen (Ap); Magnus Nilssen (Ap); Arthur Nordlie (H); and Augusta Stang (H).

1920s

1927
Results of the 1927 parliamentary election held on 17 October 1927:

The following candidates were elected:
Johan H. Andresen (H-FV); C. J. Hambro (H-FV); Olaf Josef Johansen (Ap); Helga Karlsen (Ap); Alfred Madsen (Ap); Magnus Nilssen (Ap); and Arthur Nordlie (H-FV).

1924
Results of the 1924 parliamentary election held on 21 October 1924:

The following candidates were elected:
Sigurd Astrup (H-FV); Eyvind Getz (H-FV); C. J. Hambro (H-FV); Olaf Josef Johansen (Ap); Ingvald Rastad (Ap); Martin Tranmæl (Ap); and Karl Wilhelm Wefring (H-FV).

1921
Results of the 1921 parliamentary election held on 24 October 1921:

The following candidates were elected:
Otto Bahr Halvorsen (H-FV); C. J. Hambro (H-FV); Kristian Kristensen (Ap); William Martin Nygaard (H-FV); Christian Emil Stoud Platou (H-FV); Karen Platou (H-FV); and Olav Scheflo (Ap).

Notes

References

Storting constituency
Storting constituencies
Storting constituencies established in 1921